Survivor: Cagayan — Brawn vs. Brains vs. Beauty is the 28th season of the American CBS competitive reality television series Survivor. The season was filmed in Cagayan from July 11 to August 18, 2013, and premiered on February 26, 2014 with a two-hour episode, featuring 18 new players (nine men and nine women), divided into three tribes of six based on their dominant attribute: "Brawn", "Brains" and "Beauty". For the first time since Survivor: Thailand, the finale and reunion did not take place on a Sunday but instead aired on Wednesday, May 21, 2014, in the show's regular time slot. That night, Tony Vlachos was named the Sole Survivor by a vote of 8–1 over Yung "Woo" Hwang.

Cagayan was the fourth consecutive season to be filmed in the Philippines, making it the second most-used country for filming , tied with Samoa. This season features the return of a special hidden immunity idol that can be used at Tribal Council after the votes have been read (similar to Survivor: Panama and Survivor: Cook Islands), which was hidden once the tribes merged, except this idol came without a clue. This is in addition to hidden immunity idols that must be played after the votes are cast but before they are read, as seen in Survivor: Fiji onward. This is also the first time in ten seasons, since Survivor: Tocantins, to feature two finalists, instead of three, facing the jury vote for the winner.

Contestants

The cast was composed of 18 new players, initially split into three tribes containing six members each: Aparri ("Brawn"), Luzon ("Brains"), and Solana ("Beauty"). The tribe of Luzon is named after the island in the Philippines, while Aparri and Solana are named after towns in Cagayan. Notable cast included former professional basketball player Cliff Robinson, professional poker player Garrett Adelstein, David Samson, president of Major League Baseball's Miami Marlins, and former Miss Kentucky Teen USA Jefra Bland, who placed in the top 15 at Miss Teen USA 2009. After the show, Sarah Lacina and Sole Survivor Tony Vlachos, both cops, gained notoriety as Survivor contestants.

Future appearances
Yung "Woo" Hwang, Kassandra "Kass" McQuillen, Spencer Bledsoe, and Latasha "Tasha" Fox returned for Survivor: Cambodia. Sarah Lacina and Tony Vlachos returned for Survivor: Game Changers and Survivor: Winners at War (Vlachos for winning on Cagayan, Lacina as the Game Changers winner).

Outside of Survivor, Hwang competed on the premiere of Candy Crush. In 2022, Lacina and Fox competed on The Challenge: USA. Trish Hegarty competed on the USA Network reality competition series, Snake in the Grass.

Season summary
The 18 new castaways were divided into three tribes based on primary attribute: Aparri (Brawn), Luzon (Brains), and Solana (Beauty). The Luzon tribe stumbled out of the gate, losing three of the first four immunity challenges and being reduced to only Tasha, Kass, and Spencer. The Solana tribe, led by LJ, only lost one member, Brice, while the Aparri tribe went undefeated in challenges. With 14 players remaining, the castaways were shuffled into two tribes of seven: Aparri, featuring the three Brains, three of the Beauties, and Sarah from the Brawn tribe; and Solana, consisting of Beauties LJ and Jefra, and the other five Brawns. On Solana, the Brawns initially planned to hold strong and get rid of LJ, but he and Jefra convinced Tony and Trish to turn on the Brawn alliance to vote out physical threat Cliff instead. After he was voted out, his ally Lindsey had a fight with Trish, causing her to quit the game.

The tribes merged with 11 players remaining: five from Solana and six from Aparri, becoming Solarrion. While the swapped tribes looked like they were going to stick together, Tony attempted to sway his old ally Sarah back to the Brawn-heavy Solana alliance, but Sarah was indecisive. Instead, Trish persuaded Kass to swap alliances, which she did, eliminating Sarah and putting Solana in power. Despite being in the majority, Tony's paranoia continually got the better of him as he and Woo navigated between alliances to blindside potential threats. Tony also found multiple hidden immunity idols, including a special one that could be used after the votes were read; he also lied about the special idol's "different powers"—falsely insinuating it could be used at the Final Four.

Kass, Tony, and Woo ended up in the Final Three, at which point they learned that one more person would be eliminated before the Final Tribal Council. Woo won the final immunity challenge; but while Kass seemed like an easy choice to take to the end after betraying her initial alliance, Tony convinced Woo to uphold his virtues and honor their bond as tribe-mates throughout the entire game, and Woo took Tony to the Final Two. 

At the Final Tribal Council, Woo was lambasted by the jurors for making a poor decision in bringing Tony to the end, with many of the jurors speculating he rode Tony's coattails. Though Tony was praised for his strategic game and his bluff about the super idol's power, he was also criticized for his multiple betrayals, poor social game outside of his alliance, and playing too aggressively. The last speech, from Spencer, compared Woo to Tony's "dog", saying he always followed his master and that Tony deserved to win because of his strategy. Spencer also criticized Woo's final decision. In the end, a majority of the jury decided to award Tony the title of Sole Survivor over Woo.

Episodes

Voting history

Reception

Ratings
Survivor: Cagayans premiere episode on February 26, 2014, drew in 9.4 million viewers and a 2.4 rating. Viewership was up substantially from the 8.9 million viewers of the premiere for Survivor: Caramoan, the previous winter premiere, which was the series' weakest. However, the 18-49 rating was on par with Caramoans 2.4 rating.

In its third episode, Survivor: Cagayan gained higher ratings and brought in more viewers in the 18–49 adult demographic than time-slot rival American Idol for the first time in the series' history; the episode put up 2.5/8 ratings share with 9.86 million viewers, while Idol received a ratings share of 2.4/8 and had 9.57 million viewers. This trend continued the following episode as well, this time with a rating three-tenths of a point higher than Idol.

Critical reception
The season received universal acclaim from both critics and fans, some calling it the best season since the show's early days. Consistent praise has gone to the theme of Brawn vs. Brains vs. Beauty, the exciting challenges, and the strong cast overall. Survivor: Caramoan winner John Cochran called it one of the show's best seasons, and had particular praise for the season's final six contestants, calling it the best final six in the show's history. Even host Jeff Probst, during the live reunion show, called it not only one of the best seasons, but also one of the best casts in the show's history.

Entertainment Weekly ranked it as the fourth best season of all time, behind Borneo and Micronesia (tied for first) and Heroes vs. Villains, calling it the best season with entirely new players since the very first one, and even then admitting that Borneo was only better simply by being the first. Cagayan was similarly ranked third, behind Heroes vs. Villains and Borneo, by Examiner.com, which similarly called it the best season with an entirely new cast since the original. Cagayan was ranked #1 by Survivor fan site "Survivor Oz" in its 2014 rankings of all seasons of the series, and was ranked #2 by the same list a year later. It was also ranked as the fourth-best season by "The Purple Rock Podcast." In 2020, Inside Survivor ranked this season as the show's third-best out of the first 40 saying that "Cagayan never takes its foot off the gas and is chock full of memorable characters, exciting gameplay, and iconic moments. It's a season that shows that all-new casts can still deliver and that the show doesn't have to constantly rely on returning players."

However, one criticism against the season was the inclusion of the Super Immunity Idol at the request of Hollywood notable Tyler Perry, which was panned by many fans, including former castaway Rob Cesternino from Survivor: The Amazon and Survivor: All-Stars. Nevertheless, a poll on Cesternino's podcast Rob Has a Podcast a year later saw Cagayan ranked as the third-greatest season of the series, only behind Heroes vs. Villains and Survivor: Pearl Islands, while Cesternino himself personally ranked it as the fourth-greatest. This was updated in 2021 during Cesternino's podcast, Survivor All-Time Top 40 Rankings, ranking 2nd out of 40th.

In the official CBS Watch issue commemorating the 15th anniversary of Survivor, Cagayan was voted by viewers as the fifth greatest season of the series, and was the only post-Heroes vs. Villains season to appear in the top ten. In a different poll for the same magazine, Tony was voted as the eighth greatest player in Survivor history for his performance in Cagayan. Lastly, LJ and Woo were respectively ranked fourth and fifth in the same magazine's poll for the "Hottest Male Castaway," while Morgan ranked third in the corresponding poll for "Hottest Female Castaway". In all three cases, they were the highest-ranking contestants in both polls to have competed in only one season each. In a 2015 interview, Jeff Probst admitted that, if Borneo is not taken into consideration, then Cagayan ties with Heroes vs. Villains as his personal favorite season of Survivor ever, and that Spencer ties with Rob Cesternino for his favorite non-winning contestant ever.

References

External links 
 Official CBS Survivor: Cagayan Website

2013 in Philippine television
2014 American television seasons
28
Television shows set in the Philippines
Television shows filmed in the Philippines